Anemonoides is a genus of flowering plants in the buttercup family Ranunculaceae. Plants of the genus are native to the temperate regions of the Northern Hemisphere, on the continents of North America, Europe, and Asia. The generic name Anemonoides means "anemone-like",, a reminder that many of the species were formerly included within the genus Anemone.

Species

, Kew's Plants of the World Online accepts 35 species and named hybrids in the genus Anemonoides:

References

Ranunculaceae genera